Kayou Shri Gowri (ಕಾಯೌ ಶ್ರೀ ಗೌರಿ) was the official state anthem of the Kingdom of Mysore, under the rule of the Wadiyar dynasty. The anthem was composed by Basavappa Shastry (1843-1891), the court poet of the Mysore Court under the rule of Maharaja Chamarajendra Wadiyar X, who reigned between 1868 and 1894.

History
In 1831, the Kingdom of Mysore was taken over by the British Raj. The king, Chamarajendra Wadiyar X ordered Basavappa Shastry, the court poet, to compose an anthem for the state. 

A favourite of the Maharaja, the anthem was played when Rabindranath Tagore visited Bengaluru in 1919 to deliver his speech on the “Message of the Forests.” He had come to the city at the invitation of Albion Bannerjee who was the first counsellor under the Royal Diwan, M. Kantaraj Urs.  It is believed, Tagore's song “Anondo Loke” was heavily inspired by “Kayou Shri Gowri”.

The anthem is still in use today, by the erstwhile royal family of Mysore, led by Maharaja Yaduveer Krishnadatta Chamaraja Wadiyar. It is mostly played at the Mysore Palace, when the king attends a festival or procession. It is also used and saluted by the Maharaja during the Mysore Dasara festival.

Lyrics

Music 
The anthem is set in Raga Kalyani (Carnatic) and Yaman (Hindustani). The western chords are in C major (Ionian mode). The anthem gained immense popularity and for a while was sung by school children across the state as their morning prayer.

References

Kingdom of Mysore
National anthems